Langona fusca is a jumping spider species that lives in Zimbabwe. It was first described by Wanda Wesołowska in 2011.

References

Taxa named by Wanda Wesołowska
Spiders described in 2011
Spiders of Africa
Endemic fauna of Zimbabwe
Salticidae